Isabelle Marques Vieira (born November 13, 1971) is a former Olympic freestyle swimmer from Brazil, who participated in a Summer Olympics for her native country.

At the 1988 Summer Olympics in Seoul, she finished 11th in the 4×100-metre freestyle, and 37th in the 100-metre freestyle.

She was at the 1991 Pan American Games in Havana, where she earned a bronze medal in the 4×100-metre freestyle.

References

1971 births
Living people
Brazilian female freestyle swimmers
Swimmers at the 1988 Summer Olympics
Swimmers at the 1991 Pan American Games
Olympic swimmers of Brazil
Pan American Games bronze medalists for Brazil
Pan American Games medalists in swimming
Medalists at the 1991 Pan American Games
20th-century Brazilian women